Adam Sarafian (born March 26, 1986) is an American geologist who has advanced theories about the origin of water on Earth. As a pole vaulter, he set the New Jersey state high school record and won the national championship in 2004.

Sport
The jump also set the New Jersey state record, breaking a mark of  that had been set in 1980. As of March 2020, Sarafian still holds the state high school record.

Science
A resident of Long Branch, New Jersey, he chose geology as his major at the University of Georgia, which he attended on an athletic scholarship. Sarafian has published a theory that has appeared in Science that the water on Earth is derived from asteroid impacts from 4 Vesta shortly after the formation of the solar system during a time when the Earth was far smaller and hotter that it is now and some 135 million years before previous theories had believed the planet's water had arrived. Sarafian's theory contrasts with theories that had posited that the Earth's water was derived from comet impacts. Sarafian has noted that the chemical composition of water in comets is inconsistent with what is found on Earth and that the deuterium in water in Earth is consistent with the signatures found in asteroids from Vesta fragments that have struck Earth in recent centuries. Sarafian earned a PhD from the Massachusetts Institute of Technology.

References

Living people
American geologists
American male pole vaulters
Massachusetts Institute of Technology School of Science alumni
Ocean Township High School alumni
People from Long Branch, New Jersey
People from Ocean Township, Monmouth County, New Jersey
University of Georgia alumni
Track and field athletes from New Jersey
1986 births